Aleksei Konstantinovich Karakosov (1890–1917) was a Russian footballer. He was born in Saint Petersburg and killed in World War I.

International career
Karakosov played his only game for Russia on 4 May 1913 in a friendly against Sweden. In the 75th minute the Russian goalkeeper Dmitri Matrin was injured. Substitutions were not yet allowed, so Karakosov, a midfielder, had to take Matrin's place in goal. He let in two goals.

External links
  Profile

1890 births
1917 deaths
Russian footballers
Russia international footballers
Association football midfielders
Russian military personnel killed in World War I